The 2016 Sprint Unlimited at Daytona was a NASCAR Sprint Cup Series race held on February 13, 2016, at Daytona International Speedway in Daytona Beach, Florida. Contested over 75 laps, it was the first exhibition race of the 2016 NASCAR Sprint Cup Series season.

Report

Background

The track, Daytona International Speedway, is one of six superspeedways to hold NASCAR races, the others being Michigan International Speedway, Auto Club Speedway, Indianapolis Motor Speedway, Pocono Raceway and Talladega Superspeedway. The track's turns are banked at 31 degrees, while the front stretch, the location of the finish line, is banked at 18 degrees.

Format and eligibility
The race is 75 laps in length, and is divided into two segments; the first is 25 laps and the second is 50 laps. The race is open to those drivers who won a pole in the 2015 season or had won the Sprint Unlimited previously.

Entry list
The entry list for the Sprint Unlimited was released on Friday, February 12 at 2:20 p.m. Eastern time. Twenty-five drivers are entered for the race. Tony Stewart was slated to run the Sprint Unlimited, but after suffering a burst fracture of his L1 vertebra, Brian Vickers drove in his place. While Vickers wasn't technically eligible because he doesn't fit any of the criteria for eligibility, he was cleared by NASCAR to compete in the event.

Starting lineup
The starting lineup was determined by a random draw, with Jimmie Johnson drawing the top spot.

Practice

First practice

Final practice

Race

First half

Start
Under a clear Florida night sky, Jimmie Johnson led the field to the green flag at 8:35 p.m. Brad Keselowski used a push from the outside line to lead the first lap. After five laps, the field settled into a single line until Jamie McMurray went under Casey Mears in turn 3 to move up to fourth. Eventually, Keselowski found himself working the top and bottom line to maintain the lead. Unfortunately, he had to drag the brake to let McMurray pass him going into 3 to get a piece of debris off the grill of his car. This gambit failed and fell back to 15th. The first caution of the race flew on lap 13 for a two-car wreck in turn 2. Rounding the turn, Ricky Stenhouse Jr. suffered a right-rear tire blowout and spun down into the side of Denny Hamlin. The front half of the field opted to stay out while the back half opted to pit.

Second quarter
The race restarted on lap 18. McMurray got a jump on the field, but was swallowed up and passed by teammate Kyle Larson. He was, however, able to hold the lead and pull in front of his teammate on the backstretch. The second caution of the race flew on lap 23 for a multi-car wreck in turn 1. Going into the turn, Brian Vickers suffered a right-rear tire blowout, hit the side of Dale Earnhardt Jr.'s car and ripped the side of his car off, turned back up the track, hit teammate Kevin Harvick, slammed the wall, slid back down the track and clipped Clint Bowyer. A. J. Allmendinger, Greg Biffle and Kurt Busch also sustained damage in this wreck. Vickers said he didn't "know how it happened. The '18' and I got together going four-wide early in the race and had a little smoke for a lap and it went away. I suspect that could have been it or I could have just ran over something, there's no telling.” Harvick would go on to finish last. Hamlin opted not to pit and assumed the lead.

Second half

Halfway
The race restarted on lap 30. Hamlin took command of the field and moved ahead of the No. 2 car. Eventually, Keselowski moved by him coming to the line and took the lead on lap 34. Hamlin shot ahead of Keselowski on the backstretch to take the lead back the next lap. Keselowski used a push from teammate Joey Logano to retake the lead on lap 37. Just like his first stint in the lead, he picked up another piece of debris that covered his grill. The third caution of the race flew on lap 44 for a single-car spin on the backstretch. Going down the backstretch, Johnson made contact with Mears that sent him spinning through the grass. His car dug into the ground and ripped off the front fender. He said afterwards that he "did a decent job of backing out of there and not causing a big one as the door shut on me." Keselowski opted to stay out while the rest of the field opted to pit.

The race restarted on lap 48. Hamlin powered ahead of Keselowski to take over the lead on lap 49. The fourth caution of the race flew with 20 laps to go for a multi-car wreck on the backstretch. Going into turn 3, Kasey Kahne got turned by McMurray and slammed into the side of Allmendinger.

Fourth quarter
The race restarted with 14 laps to go. Keselowski got a run on Hamlin in the tri-oval to take the lead back with 12 laps to go. The fifth caution of the race flew with 10 laps to go after Kahne lost an engine in turn 2.

The race restarted with six laps to go. Hamlin was able to hold off charges from his teammate Matt Kenseth and Logano. The sixth caution of the race flew with three laps to go for a multi-car wreck on the backstretch. In a classic restrictor plate racing accordion effect, Carl Edwards got turned into the wall and a number of cars spun out. This would lead to the debut of the new overtime rules NASCAR put into play two days prior.

Overtime
The race restarted with two laps to go. The field passed the overtime line and the race was official at that point. After a multi-car wreck in turn 1, Hamlin was declared the race winner.

Post-race
Hamlin said after the race in victory lane that he's "gotten better at speedway racing over the last few years and really learned a lot from my teammates. But realistically you can go back and look at this race a million times, and had my teammates not stuck with me at the right times, we wouldn't have been able to stay up front." He added he "wanted to get to the (overtime) line, because we probably didn’t have enough fuel to go five more laps."

After a runner-up finish, Logano said that he thought he had Hamlin "if that caution didn’t come out at the end." He followed up by saying had "I got that push from the 42, [Kyle] Larson, I might have done it. It just didn’t line up perfectly.”

After finishing 10th, Biffle spoke on the new overtime rule saying he thought "it was OK. I get what they're trying to do. They're trying to prevent people from changing the outcome of the race and make that mark back there, and that makes sense. It'll take us a little bit to get used to that, but I understand it."

After finishing 11th, Danica Patrick said that she doesn't "think it'll end up making a humongous difference. I mean, the likelihood of having a lot of accidents within the first corner, they're not super-high. I don't know. I think it'll be fine. I don't think we'll really notice a huge difference."

After finishing 13th, Martin Truex Jr. said that "in this day and age, we always judge everything on the fans' reaction. So I guess we'll wait and see what they say about it."

Race results

Media

Television

Radio

See also
2016 Can-Am Duels, held on February 18
2016 Daytona 500, held on February 21

References

2016 NASCAR Sprint Cup Series
2016 in sports in Florida
NASCAR races at Daytona International Speedway
February 2016 sports events in the United States